The Japanese Problem, also referred to as the Japanese Menace or the Japanese Conspiracy, was the name given to racial tensions in Hawaii between the European-American sugarcane plantation owners and the Japanese immigrants hired to work in the cane fields.

Origins
The term "Japanese Problem" came into use during the 1920 Oahu Sugar Strike.

Following the strike, powerful European-Americans like Walter Dillingham and Harry Baldwin were vocal about their concerns regarding the increasing Japanese population in Hawaii. They worried that the increasing Japanese population would eventually affect politics in Hawaii as the voter base changed. Ultimately, they were most concerned that the Japanese were loyal to Japan, and would allow the Japanese Empire to claim Hawaii.

Wallace Farrington pointed out in a speech in 1920 that even though the strikes were caused by "malcontents and agitators", the Japanese had to be given the chance to Americanize. This notion was pushed back against by people both within Hawaii and on the U.S. Mainland, like Valentine McClatchy, who claimed that the Japanese could not integrate into American culture because they held on to their own culture and religion too fervently.

Further reading

References

See also 

 Japanese in Hawaii
 Politics in Hawaii during the 1920s
 Yellow Peril

Japanese
Anti-Japanese sentiment in the United States
History of sugar
Japanese-American culture in Hawaii